Iceland's first ambassador to Czechoslovakia was Pétur Benediktsson in 1946. Iceland's last ambassador to Czechoslovakia was Einar Benediktsson in 1993.

List of ambassadors

See also
Foreign relations of Iceland
Ambassadors of Iceland

References
List of Icelandic representatives (Icelandic Foreign Ministry website) 

1946 establishments
1993 disestablishments
Main
Czechoslovakia
Iceland